Patrick Hooper (12 May 1952 – 9 October 2020) was an Olympian and long-distance runner from Raheny, Dublin, Ireland.

Career
He represented Ireland in the marathon at European and Olympic level. His marathon personal best time was 2:17:46. He was the older brother of three-time Olympian and marathoner Dick Hooper. After his retirement from active competition, Hooper remained extremely active in the sport, as a long-serving committee member of his club, Raheny Shamrock Athletic Club, and as a member of the Dublin and Leinster Athletics Boards.

Hooper died on 9 October 2020, aged 68, of a suspected heart attack.

Achievements
All results regarding marathon

References

1952 births
2020 deaths
People from Raheny
Irish male long-distance runners
Athletes (track and field) at the 1980 Summer Olympics
Olympic athletes of Ireland
People educated at St Paul's College, Raheny